The Chinese Taipei Weightlifting Association (CTWA) is the organization representing the sport of Olympic weightlifting in the Republic of China (Taiwan), also known as Chinese Taipei.

History 
It was established in 1962, and is a current member of both the Asian Weightlifting Federation and the International Weightlifting Federation. In 2019, IWF General Secretary Mohammed Hasan Jalood visited Taiwan and met CTWA President Chang Yang Po-Lien.

See also 

 Taiwanese records in Olympic weightlifting
 List of world records in Olympic weightlifting
 Chinese Taipei at the Olympics
 Asian Weightlifting Championships

External links 

 Official website
 Facebook page

References 

Weightlifting in Taiwan
Sports governing bodies in Taiwan